917 Lyka (prov. designation:  or ) is a background asteroid, approximately  in diameter, located in the inner region of the asteroid belt. It was discovered on 5 September 1915, by Russian astronomer Grigory Neujmin at the Simeiz Observatory on the Crimean peninsula. The X-type asteroid has a rotation period of 7.9 hours and is likely spherical in shape. It was named after Lyka, a friend of the discoverer's sister.

Orbit and classification 

Lyka is a non-family asteroid of the main belt's background population when applying the hierarchical clustering method to its proper orbital elements. It orbits the Sun in the inner main-belt at a distance of 1.9–2.9 AU once every 3 years and 8 months (1,342 days; semi-major axis of 2.38 AU). Its orbit has an eccentricity of 0.20 and an inclination of 5° with respect to the ecliptic. The body's observation arc begins at Simeiz on 1 September 1926, eleven years after to its official discovery observation.

Naming 

This minor planet was named after Lyka, a friend of the sister of discoverer Grigory Neujmin. Lutz Schmadel, the author of the Dictionary of Minor Planet Names learned about the meaning of the asteroid's name from private communications with long-time Simeiz astronomer Nikolai Chernykh.

Physical characteristics 

In both the Tholen- and SMASS-like taxonomy of the Small Solar System Objects Spectroscopic Survey (S3OS2), Lyka is an X-type asteroid.

Rotation period 

In January 2005, a rotational lightcurve of Lyka was obtained from photometric observations by Matthieu Conjat. Lightcurve analysis gave a well-defined rotation period of  hours with a low brightness variation of  magnitude, indicative of a rather spherical shape.

Diameter and albedo 

The Collaborative Asteroid Lightcurve Link derives an albedo of 0.0520 and a diameter of 27.89 km based on an absolute magnitude of 11.6. An asteroid occultation, observed on 4 March 2005, gave a best-fit ellipse dimension of 28.0×28.0 kilometers. These timed observations are taken when the asteroid passes in front of a distant star. However the quality of the measurement is rated poorly.

References

External links 
 Lightcurve Database Query (LCDB), at www.minorplanet.info
 Dictionary of Minor Planet Names, Google books
 Asteroids and comets rotation curves, CdR – Geneva Observatory, Raoul Behrend
 Discovery Circumstances: Numbered Minor Planets (1)-(5000) – Minor Planet Center
 
 

000917
Discoveries by Grigory Neujmin
Named minor planets
19150905